Sarkaņi Parish is an administrative unit of Madona Municipality, Latvia.

Parishes of Latvia
Madona Municipality